Phalgunanda is a rural municipality (gaunpalika) out of seven rural municipality located in Panchthar District of Province No. 1 of Nepal. There are a total of 8 municipalities in Panchthar in which 1 is urban and 7 are rural.

24060 as of Census of Nepal 2011.

Nawamidanda, Imbung, Pauwa Sartap, Chilingdin, Aangsarang and Phaktep which previously were all separate Village development committee merged to form this new local level body. Fulfilling the requirement of the new Constitution of Nepal 2015, Ministry of Federal Affairs and Local Development replaced all old VDCs and Municipalities into 753 new local level body (Municipality).

The rural municipality is divided into total 7 wards and the headquarter of this newly formed rural municipality is situated in Phaktep.

References

External links
 Official website
 Final District 1-75 Corrected Last for RAJPATRA

Rural municipalities in Koshi Province
Populated places in Panchthar District
Rural municipalities of Nepal established in 2017
Rural municipalities in Panchthar District